Ganjami Odia (ଗଞ୍ଜାମୀ ଓଡ଼ିଆ) or Southern Odia or commonly known as Berhampuria is a dialect of the Odia language spoken in Ganjam, Gajapati and Kandhamal districts of Odisha and in the Srikakulam district of Andhra Pradesh. The variant spoken in Berhampur is known as Berhampuria (ବ୍ରହ୍ମପୁରିଆ).

Comparison
The following is a list of common (but not exhaustive) differences between Ganjami and standard Odia:

References

Further reading 
 

Eastern Indo-Aryan languages
Languages of Odisha
Odia language